Ennis Samuel Rees, Jr. (March 17, 1925 – March 24, 2009) was an American poet and professor. He was named by Governor Richard Wilson Riley as the third South Carolina Poet Laureate from 1984 to 1985.

Biography

Early life and education
Rees was born in Newport News, Virginia, on March 17, 1925. His parents were Ennis Samuel, Sr., and Dorothy Drumwright Rees. In high school, he participated in track and lettered in football, focusing more on athletics than academics. He was also student body vice president and his senior class vice president as well.

He graduated from the College of William & Mary with an A.B. degree in 1946 where he was Phi Beta Kappa. He then went on to obtain both his M.A., in 1948, and Ph.D., in 1951, from Harvard University.

Career
After graduating from Harvard with his M.A. degree, Rees became an English instructor at Duke University in 1949 while still pursuing his Ph.D. from Harvard. He remained at Duke until 1952 when he became an instructor at Princeton University from 1952 to 1954. He then began a long career at the University of South Carolina in 1954, eventually becoming a full professor in 1963. He remained a professor at the university until his retirement in 1988.

Poet laureateship
Rees was named to be South Carolina's third poet laureate by Governor Dick Riley in 1984. Originally a life-time appointment, Riley changed the position some during his governorship and appointed Freeman to only a one-year term of office.

Personal life
Rees was married to the former Marion Lott. They had three children.

Awards and honors
 South Carolina Poet Laureate – 1984
 South Carolina Academy of Authors honoree – 1999

Works
In addition to his published books, some of Ennis' work has appeared in Journal of English, The Southern Review, The New Republic, and Germanic Philology.

Non-fiction
 The Tragedies of George Chapman: Renaissance Ethics in Action, Harvard University Press, 1954; Octagon Books, 1979,

Poetry
 Selected Poems University of South Carolina Press, 1973,

Children's verse
 The Song of Paul Bunyan and Tony Beaver (1964)
 Riddles, Riddles Everywhere (Abelard-Schuman, 1964)
 Pun Fun (Abelard-Schuman, 1965)
 Fables from Aesop (Oxford University Press, 1966)
 Windwagon Smith (1966)
 Tiny Tall Tales (1967)
 Teeny Tiny Duck and the Pretty Money (Prentice-Hall, 1967)
 Brer Rabbit and His Tricks (Young Scott Books, 1967)
 The Little Greek Alphabet Book (Prentice-Hall, 1968)
 More of Brer Rabbit's Tricks (1968)
 Gillygaloos and Gollywhoppers (1969)
 Potato Talk (1969)
 Fast Freddie Frog and other tongue-twister rhymes (Caroline House distributed by St. Martin's Press, 1993)

Translations
 Homer's The Odyssey (Random House, 1960)
 Homer's The Iliad (Random House, 1963)

References

1925 births
2009 deaths
Poets Laureate of South Carolina
American male poets
College of William & Mary alumni
Harvard University alumni
People from Newport News, Virginia
Writers from Columbia, South Carolina
University of South Carolina faculty
Poets from South Carolina
20th-century American poets
Translators of Homer
20th-century American male writers